LaGrange is a city in and the county seat of Troup County, Georgia, United States. The population of the city was estimated to be 30,858 in 2020 by the U.S. Census Bureau. It is the principal city of the LaGrange, Georgia Micropolitan Statistical Area, which is included in the Atlanta-Sandy Springs-Gainesville, Georgia-Alabama (part) Combined Statistical Area.

LaGrange is home to LaGrange College, the oldest private college in the state. Started as a girls' academy, it has been affiliated since the late 19th century with the Methodist Church, and what is now the North Georgia Conference of the United Methodist Church. The city's proximity to West Point Lake, a few miles to the west, helps attract bass fishermen and water sports enthusiasts to the city.

It is the hometown of rapper and songwriter Bubba Sparxxx, best known for hiphop and country rap.

The Troup County Courthouse, Annex, and Jail, built in 1939, is one of LaGrange's properties that is listed on the National Register of Historic Places.

History

LaGrange is named after the country estate near Paris of the wife of the Marquis de La Fayette. When La Fayette, a Revolutionary War hero, visited Georgia in 1825 on a national tour, he remarked on the similarity of local topography to his wife's property.

The European-American settlement of LaGrange began in the early 19th century, soon after the territory was ceded to the United States by the Creek Indians and the territorial legislature established Troup County. The city was incorporated in December 1828. The area was developed for cotton plantations, and planters migrating from the eastern areas of the South brought along or bought enslaved African Americans in the domestic slave trade to use as laborers.

By 1860 Troup County had become the fourth-wealthiest county in Georgia, based on cotton as a commodity crop. It was the fifth-largest slaveholding county in the state. As the county seat, LaGrange was a center of trade for this prosperous area, and wealthy planters built more than 100 significant homes in the city.

During the American Civil War, LaGrange was defended by a volunteer women's auxiliary group known as the Nancy Harts or Nancy Hart Rifles, named after Nancy Hart. After defeating the Confederates in nearby West Point, Georgia, Colonel Oscar H. La Grange led his Union troops to the county seat of LaGrange. He placed Confederate prisoners near the front of the column. The Nancy Harts negotiated a surrender with the colonel.

Although local assets were burned and looted by Union troops, Colonel La Grange spared the private homes of LaGrange, including Bellevue, the home of former US Senator and then Confederate senator Benjamin Harvey Hill, a slave owner. La Grange may have been returning positive treatment which he had earlier received while in captivity. He had been given medical care by Confederates and was attended by a niece of Senator Hill. After recovery, Col. La Grange was exchanged for a Confederate prisoner, and he returned to battle duty.

To show their gratitude for his sparing their homes, one of the Nancy Harts hosted a dinner for Col. La Grange. He paroled some local prisoners so they could attend. Many women of the town cooked all night to provide the meal. The next morning the Federal troops marched out, taking various men of the town as prisoners of war. They were soon released, when it was learned that General Robert E. Lee had surrendered at Appomattox.

20th century to present
In the late 19th century, LaGrange developed as a railroad center and as an industrial center. Textile mills were developed here and elsewhere in the upland region. Initially they employed only white workers. They increased in regional, state and national economic importance into the mid-20th century. Gradually in the late 20th century, much textile manufacturing moved "offshore," out of the United States.

The city has transitioned to a mixed economy with some new industries. Interstates 85 and 185 pass through LaGrange, which is a transportation hub in the area. The city has industrial and commercial access, and a Wal-Mart Distribution Center was developed here.

Interface, the world's leading manufacturer of carpet tile, was founded in LaGrange in 1973. It has its largest manufacturing center here. LaGrange is also the North American headquarters for Caterpillar's forestry division. Just south of LaGrange in neighboring West Point, also in Troup County, KIA Motors has its only US assembly plant. Many of Kia's suppliers are located in LaGrange.

The city of LaGrange is a full-service utility provider for the region, including electricity, natural gas, water, sewer, refuse collection, and telecommunication. In 2000 the city was named "Intelligent Community of the Year" by the Intelligent Community Forum, joining other cities such as New York, Singapore, Seoul, Glasgow and Toronto. Since 2000 the city has provided free Internet service to every household. It also has been ranked as a Georgia City of Excellence, and received a Government Technology Leadership Award.

LaGrange was in the news in late January 2017 for the public apology of its police chief and mayor for the city's failure in 1940 to protect Austin Callaway, a 16-year-old African-American resident, from being lynched. The police did not report nor investigate his murder very thoroughly.

On November 8, 2021, it was announced that Upstate New York-based firearms manufacturer, Remington Arms, would be moving their global headquarters from Ilion, New York to La Grange, and would be hiring 865 people over the span of five years. Construction is expected to cost $100 million.

The southern half of the city was heavily damaged by an EF2 tornado on January 12, 2023. The tornado injured four people along its path as well.

Geography
LaGrange is at 33.0367° N, 85.0319° W. The city is in west central Georgia along Interstates 85 and 185, which run east of the city, with Interstate 85 leading northeast  to Atlanta and southwest  to Montgomery, Alabama. Interstate 85 gives direct access to the city from exits 13, 14 and 18. Interstate 185 runs south from the city  to Columbus. U.S. Route 27, U.S. Route 29, Georgia State Route 219, and Georgia State Route 109 all meet in the interior of the city.

Government

LaGrange is governed by a mayor and six-person city council. The mayor is elected citywide (at-large). Three  council members are elected to one post each from each of two council districts, designated as 1a, 1b, and 1c from the first district, with similar naming for posts in the second district. Candidates must declare for a post in one of the districts at the time of their filing, and must win a majority to be elected. This system was established for the first municipal election in 2011. (This was in compliance with a consent decree and court order settling litigation since 1982 under Section 5 of the Voting Rights Act of 1965.)

Previously a smaller number of city council members were elected at-large; as each candidate had to command a majority of electors, the minority seldom could elect a candidate of their choice. The Department of Justice recorded objections to the city of LaGrange changes to election methods in October 1993 and December 1994. The 1993 objection related to the use of two at-large seats in a mixed city council plan with four single-member districts; the 1994 objection related to the use of one at-large seat in a mixed city council plan with two "super-districts" and four single-member districts.
From 1997, more city council seats were established in LaGrange. Municipal elections are held in odd-numbered years.

Councilman Mark Mitchell currently serves as Mayor Pro Tem. A special election will be held on March 21, 2023 to determine the next Mayor of LaGrange. The mayor and all council members are elected for four-year terms on a nonpartisan basis. The city council hires a full-time city manager, who oversees daily operations of city departments.

In January 2017, Police Chief Louis M. Dekmar apologized publicly for his department's failure in 1940 to protect a 16-year-old black youth, who was lynched. Few law enforcement officials have ever apologized for such events. Mayor Jim Thornton also apologized and stressed the city's commitment to improving conditions.

"I sincerely regret and denounce the role our Police Department played in Austin's lynching, both through our action and our inaction," Chief Dekmar told a crowd at a traditionally African-American church. "And for that, I'm profoundly sorry. It should never have happened."

Amenities
Descendants of the Callaway family, wealthy planters in the antebellum years, established a philanthropic foundation. They have invested in the city, and contributed to developing important cultural elements of the city. As a result, LaGrange has amenities not usually found in a city of its size. These include "two art galleries, a symphony orchestra, a ballet company, an opera company, an airport, a television station, an archives, two colleges (LaGrange College and West Georgia Technical College), and thirteen recreational centers with facilities for every sport."

Demographics

2020 census

As of the 2020 United States census, there were 30,858 people, 11,246 households, and 6,862 families residing in the city.

2019
As of the 2019 U.S. Census estimate, there were 30,305 people in 11,233 households residing in the city. The population density was 1033 per square mile. The racial makeup of the city was 48.0% Black, 44.5% White, 4.7% Hispanic/Latino, 2.5% Asian only, 1.8% mixed race, and 0.3% other. The median household income was $30,653.

Education

Troup County School District 
The Troup County School System holds pre-school to grade 12, and consists of 15 elementary schools, three middle schools (Callaway Middle School, Gardner Newman Middle School, and Long Cane Middle School), and three high schools (Callaway High School, LaGrange High School, and Troup County Comprehensive High School. The county is divided into three school zones. The county school system serves Hogansville, LaGrange and West Point. It is home to over 20 new and recently renovated schools.

Private education
Hillside Montessori
Lafayette Christian
LaGrange Academy
Oak Grove Christian Academy
Sound Doctrine Christian Academy

Higher education
LaGrange College - Main Campus
Point University
West Georgia Technical College

Transportation
LaGrange-Callaway Airport is southwest of the city.

Sister cities
LaGrange has three sister cities, as designated by Sister Cities International, Inc. (SCI):
 Craigavon, County Armagh, Northern Ireland, United Kingdom
 Poti, Samegrelo-Zemo Svaneti, Georgia (country)
  Aso, Kumamoto, Japan

The city is in the process of developing a sister city relationship in South Korea.

Notable people
Hammett L. Bowen Jr. – recipient of Medal of Honor
Mary G. Bryan – archivist
Chris Burnette – NFL player
Austin Callaway – 16-year-old African American youth lynched by whites on September 8, 1940
Fuller Earle Callaway – textile magnate
Daz Cameron – Major League Baseball player
Mike Cameron – former Major League Baseball player
Wallace H. Clark Jr. – pathologist and cancer researcher; born (c.1924) and raised in LaGrange
Joyce Grable – former professional wrestler; born (c. 1952) and raised in LaGrange
Jimmy Haynes – Major League Baseball player
Albert E. Jarrell – Vice Admiral, U.S. Navy; born in Rome, Georgia, but raised in LaGrange
Tom Jarriel – ABC news correspondent; born in LaGrange in 1934
John Johnson – National Football League (NFL) player
Elijah Kelley – actor
David Kelton – Major League Baseball player
Mike Lazzo – network executive for Adult Swim
Wynona Lipman (1923–1999) – first African-American woman elected to New Jersey Senate
Randolph Mahaffey – professional basketball player, born in LaGrange
Lincoln Wayne "Chips" Moman – record producer and songwriter
Lewis Render Morgan – Georgia state representative and judge
Fred Newman – actor
Bubba Sparxxx – rapper
James M. Sprayberry – recipient of the Medal of Honor 
Dernell Stenson – Major League Baseball Player
Horace Ward – first African-American federal judge in Georgia; also first person to attempt to integrate University of Georgia law school
Carla Williams - Athletic Director at the University of Virginia
Wesley Woodyard – NFL player
Louis Tompkins Wright – physician, graduate of Harvard Medical School, first African-American physician to be appointed to staff of a New York City municipal hospital; notable for many scientific breakthroughs, including introduction of intradermal smallpox vaccination

Gallery

See also
Georgia Radio Museum and Hall of Fame 
National Register of Historic Places listings in Troup County, Georgia

References

External links
 
 LaGrange - Troup County Chamber of Commerce
 Nancy Harts at Battle of West Point website
 "Legacy: The Secret History of Proto-Fascism in America's Greatest Little City"

1828 establishments in Georgia (U.S. state)
Cities in Georgia (U.S. state)
Cities in Troup County, Georgia
County seats in Georgia (U.S. state)
Micropolitan areas of Georgia (U.S. state)
Georgia populated places on the Chattahoochee River
Populated places established in 1828